South Acomita Village is a census designated place (CDP) in Cibola County, New Mexico, United States. The population was 105 at the 2010 census.

Geography
South Acomita Village is located in northern Cibola County at  near the northeastern corner of Acoma Pueblo. It occupies land on the south side of the valley of the Rio San Jose. North Acomita Village is directly to the north on Indian Service Route 30.

Demographics

Education
All public schools in the county are operated by Grants/Cibola County Schools.

See also
Acoma Pueblo
Acoma Indian Reservation

References

Acoma Pueblo
Census-designated places in Cibola County, New Mexico
Census-designated places in New Mexico